is the name given to the concept of building new high-speed narrow gauge railway lines in Japan to extend the Shinkansen network of high-speed lines.

No Super Tokkyū routes have actually been built.

Concept
The Super Tokkyū concept involves building new narrow-gauge lines along the routes of planned Shinkansen lines. Although they would be slower than regular Shinkansen trains, they would have a speed of more than 200 km/h, enabling some reductions in journey times to be achieved, and total construction expenditure could be spread over a longer period, with travel times gradually reduced as more sections are completed.

The ultimate goal is eventual conversion to standard-gauge Shinkansen track once the entire line is completed, but with gauge change trains (GCTs), it may be possible in the future to upgrade these sections to full Shinkansen specifications even while inter-operation with conventional lines remains in place.

Proposals
In 1991, the Super Tokkyū concept was formally planned to be used as part of the following three Shinkansen extensions:

 Kyushu Shinkansen southern section between Yatsushiro and Nishi-Kagoshima
 Tohoku Shinkansen extension between Morioka and Hakodate through the Seikan Tunnel
 Hokuriku Shinkansen extension beyond Nagano
These schemes were subsequently constructed to full Shinkansen specification lines.

The West Kyushu Shinkansen route to Nagasaki was also initially proposed as a Super Tokkyū line from Takeo-Onsen. However, after construction commenced the proposal changed to incorporate GCTs, resulting in the Takeo Onsen to Nagasaki section (due to open in March 2023) being constructed as standard gauge lines. The service is proposed by GCTs using the Hakata to Shin-Tosu section of the Kyushu Shinkansen, then the narrow gauge line to Takeo Onsen, then the new West Kyushu Shinkansen line for the final section of the trip.

See also
 Gauge Change Train, an experimental train designed to operate on both narrow-gauge and standard-gauge routes
 Mini-shinkansen, the concept of converting narrow-gauge lines to standard gauge for use by Shinkansen trains

References

Shinkansen